Steals and Deals is an evening business news talk show aired weekdays from 7:30 to 8PM ET on CNBC from 1990 until c. 1997. Hosted by Janice Lieberman. Produced by Glenn Ruppel.

Steals and Deals was CNBC's nightly investigative consumer finance show.  The show's tagline was "if it sounds too good to be true, it probably is."

External links
Steals and Deals 1993 clip

Steals And Deals at http://www.StealsAndDeals.com is a Discount Shopping website. It is the first and original 
Steals And Deals website online since 1998. Also known as "The Online Mall of Steals And 
Deals".

1990 American television series debuts
1997 American television series endings
1990s American television news shows
1990s American television talk shows
CNBC original programming
Business-related television series